Maksim Borisovich Kabanov (born 30 December 1982) is a Russian former footballer.

Club career
A youth product of FC Spartak Moscow, he joined FC Fakel Voronezh on loan in February 2002.

In December 2003, he signed a 5-year contract with FC Torpedo Moscow.

He played 2 games in the UEFA Champions League 2001–02 for FC Spartak Moscow.

Honours
 Russian Premier League champion: 2001.

Personal life
He is the older brother of Sergei Kabanov.

References

1982 births
Living people
Russian footballers
Russia under-21 international footballers
Russian Premier League players
Association football goalkeepers
Footballers from Moscow
FC Spartak Moscow players
FC Spartak-2 Moscow players
FC Fakel Voronezh players
FC Torpedo Moscow players
FC Salyut Belgorod players
FC Volgar Astrakhan players
FC SKA-Khabarovsk players
FC Rostov players